The 86th Aeromedical Evacuation Squadron (86 AES) is a unit of the United States Air Force. It is part of the 86th Operations Group, 86th Airlift Wing at Ramstein Air Base, Germany. It is a component of Third Air Force and United States Air Forces Europe.

The 86 AES provides operational aeromedical evacuation for U.S. troops in the United States European Command and United States Africa Command areas of responsibility using, primarily, Boeing C-17 Globemaster III, Boeing KC-135 Stratotanker, Gates Learjet C-21A and Lockheed Martin C-130J Super Hercules aircraft.

The squadron was constituted as the 86 Aeromedical Evacuation Squadron on 27 May 1994, and activated on 16 August 1994. 

The unit is manned by Flight Nurses, Medical Service Corps officers and Aeromedical Evacuation Technicians; as well as medical administration and logistics technicians.

History 
Major operations the squadron has participated in include:
 Operation Enduring Freedom
 Operation Iraqi Freedom
 Operation Unified Protector
 Operation Unified Response
 Operation Joint Endeavor
 Operation Allied Force
The 86 AES provided AE coverage for deployed US and NATO forces. This included the airlift of former prisoners of war Specialist Steven Gonzales and Staff Sergeants Christopher Stone and Andrew Ramirez, to Ramstein Air Base, Germany, from Zagreb, Croatia. They had been captured by Serbian forces while patrolling in the Republic of Macedonia, during Operation Allied Force.
 Operation Deliberate Force
 Bombing of USS Cole
On October 12, 2000, crew from the 86 Aeromedical Evacuation Squadron and CCATT team members from Landstuhl Regional Medical launched on C-9 Nightingales from the 75th Airlift Squadron to Djibouti and Yemen. In total 28 Sailors were airlifted back to definitive care in Germany by 14 October 2000.
 Bombing of the Khobar Towers

Partnership Building
Since it is uniquely situated among active duty USAF AE units, the 86 AES participates regularly in partnership building visits with allied nations.
 Poland
 Germany
 Norway

Station 
 Ramstein AB, Germany, 16 August 1994

Superintendents

Major Unit Awards
 Mackay Trophy
 Air Mobility Rodeo 2009 - Best Aeromedical Evacuation Team

Historical Unit Patches

References

 Much of this text in an early version of this article was taken from pages on the Ramstein Air Base website, which as a work of the U.S. Government is presumed to be a public domain resource. That information was supplemented by:

External links
 Ramstein AFB Home Page
 
 

Aeromedical evacuation squadrons of the United States Air Force
Military units and formations established in 1994